Panchrol is a  village and a gram panchayat in the Egra I CD block in the Egra subdivision of the Purba Medinipur district in the state of West Bengal, India.

History
In the Egra copper plate inscription recovered at Panchrol, it is mentioned that Ekatakaksha was an administrative centre during the rule of Shashanka.

Geography

Location

Urbanisation
96.96% of the population of Egra subdivision live in the rural areas. Only 3.04% of the population live in the urban areas, and that is the lowest proportion of urban population amongst the four subdivisions in Purba Medinipur district.

Note: The map alongside presents some of the notable locations in the subdivision. All places marked in the map are linked in the larger full screen map.

Demographics
According to the 2011 Census of India, Panchrol had a total population of 5,615, of which 2913 (52%) were males and 2,702 (48%) were females. There were 543 persons in the age range of 0–6 years. The total number of literate persons in Panchrol was 4,425 (87.24% of the population over 6 years).

Culture
David J. McCutchion mentions:
 The Sharabhuja temple as a large Chandni or dalan type with verandah on three or more sides, measuring 27’ 3” x 42’ 9”, with terracotta and stucco work, belonging to the mid-19th century. 
 The Madana Mohana temple belongs to the same category, measuring 24’ 3” x 39’ 7”, largely plain, belonging to the mid-19th century. 
 The Vrindavanjiu temple belongs to the same category, measuring 24’ 3” x 25” 3”, with terracotta and stucco work, built in 1909. 
 The Radha Vinoda temple is flat-roofed with smooth rekha superstructure, measuring 25” x 35’ 2”, with rich stucco work, built possibly in 1816. The upper rekha deul has a porch with cornice and straight ridging.

Panchrol picture gallery

Healthcare
There is a  primary health centre at Kasabagola, PO Panchrol (with 2 beds).

References

External links

Villages in Purba Medinipur district